Nova Topola may refer to:

Nova Topola, Lebane, in Serbia
Nova Topola, Gradiška, in Bosnia and Herzegovina

See also
Topola (disambiguation)